Amanda Nildén (born 7 August 1998) is a Swedish professional footballer who plays as a centre back for Serie A club Juventus FC and the Sweden women's national team.

Club career 
A versatile left-sided defender or midfielder, she previously played in Sweden for IF Brommapojkarna, AIK and Eskilstuna United. She has represented Sweden up to first team level.

Nildén missed the entire 2015 season with an anterior cruciate ligament injury. She signed for AIK in February 2017, emulating her father David and grandfather Jim who both played for the Stockholm club.

On 2 August 2021, Nildén joined Juventus. On 18 August, she made her debut in a 12–0 win against Macedonian side Kamenica Sasa in the semi-finals of the first round of the UEFA Women's Champions League.

Personal life
In 2018 Nildén was in a relationship with Viktor Gyökeres, who is a male professional footballer. When Gyökeres transferred from Sweden to Brighton & Hove Albion, Nildén tried out for the club's professional women's team and impressed enough to be given a contract.

Honours
Juventus
 Serie A: 2021–22
 Coppa Italia: 
 Supercoppa Italiana: 2021–22

References

External links
 
 
 
 

1998 births
Living people
Women's association football defenders
Brighton & Hove Albion W.F.C. players
Women's Super League players
Swedish women's footballers
AIK Fotboll (women) players
Footballers from Stockholm
IF Brommapojkarna (women) players
Juventus F.C. (women) players
Serie A (women's football) players
Swedish expatriate women's footballers
Swedish expatriate sportspeople in England
Expatriate women's footballers in England
Swedish expatriate sportspeople in Italy
Expatriate women's footballers in Italy
Sweden women's international footballers
UEFA Women's Euro 2022 players